Stanley Michael Gartler (born June 9, 1923) is a cell and molecular biologist and human geneticist. He was the first scientist to offer conclusive evidence for the clonality of human cancers. He showed that HeLa cells had contaminated many cell lines thought to be unique. Stanley Gartler is currently Professor Emeritus of Medicine and Genome Sciences at the University of Washington.

Biography
Gartler was born in Los Angeles, California in 1923 of Romanian immigrant parents. He attended public school in Los Angeles and completed two years at university (UCLA) before enlisting in the Army Air Force during World War II. He was a radio operator machine gunner and flew combat missions with the 9th Air Force. After the war, on the G.I. Bill, he completed his undergraduate education at UCLA and entered the Ph.D. program in Genetics at UC Berkeley. He originally thought of applying genetics to agricultural work, but near the end of his graduate work he made a career switch and decided to enter the field of human genetics. In 1952 he received a public health postdoctoral fellowship and spent five years at Columbia University studying human genetics. In 1957 Gartler was recruited by Arno G. Motulsky to join his newly established Division of Medical Genetics in the Department of Medicine at the University of Washington in Seattle. He was a founding member of the Department of Genetics at the University of Washington in 1959. Stanley became a professor emeritus in 1993.

Work
In 1965, Stanley Gartler and David Linder were able to demonstrate clonality of tumors in human females using an event (X chromosome inactivation) that occurs early in development in mammalian females. X chromosome inactivation randomly silences most of the genes on one of the two X chromosomes in every cell of the embryo. The female thus becomes a mosaic for any X-linked gene for which she is heterozygous, and normal tissues are therefore composed of a nearly equal mixture of cells expressing the two different phenotypes.  However, if a tumor begins from a single cell, then all the cells of the tumor should express the same X-linked allele. By examining expression of different isoenzymes of the sex-linked glucose-6-phosphate dehydrogenase (G6PD) locus in heterozygous women, Gartler and Linder demonstrated that leiomyoma tumor cells, even from cancers consisting of billions of cells, expressed only one form of the marker, whereas even small patches of normal tissue contained cells expressing both forms of the marker. This finding was consistent with the growth of a single founder cell into a tumor.  The clonal origin of tumors has been confirmed many times since, initially through the work of a junior colleague Philip J. Fialkow.

In 1967, Gartler was interested in establishing a system for studying human genetics in somatic cell culture. He initially collected eighteen (supposedly) independently derived established human cell lines, including HeLa. Examining isoenzymes, he typed them for a number of genetic polymorphisms, including the X linked G6PD variant. The cell lines turned out to be genetically identical, and further, all carried the G6PD allele found almost exclusively in people of African descent. HeLa, the first successfully established human cell line, was derived from a woman of African descent named Henrietta Lacks, so this result suggested that the cell lines were not truly independent, but had been contaminated by HeLa cells.

It was not realized at the time that nearly all attempts to establish human cell cultures resulted in cell lines with limited life spans. Dr. George Gey, the originator of HeLa, had sent his cells to all who requested them, and this problem arose because many workers were growing the immortal HeLa cell and mortal human cell strains in the same lab. Since the use of genetic markers to characterize and distinguish cell lines at the time was virtually non-existent, contamination by HeLa went undetected. In spite of the evidence, initially, the idea of laboratory errors leading to cross culture contamination was not universally accepted: an alternative explanation was that, when cultures became established, their G6PD phenotype changed.  Gartler's original paper to Nature went to lengths to dismiss this possibility, surveying over 100 tumors to see if there was a phenotypic change in either G6PD or PGM, as well as trying other experimental approaches to test the idea. He concluded that "all evidence seems to point to the stability of the G6PD and PGM phenotypes both in vivo and in vitro."  Further evidence against the possibility came when Nellie Auesperg and Gartler found a truly independently established human cell line, which demonstrated unique genetic markers. Cross culture contamination is now a generally accepted risk, and there are many genetic markers available to accurately characterize human cell cultures. However, the problem of cross culture contamination has not disappeared. Walter Nelson-Rees took up the issue some ten years after the original Gartler report, and continued to write about the problem for almost 25 years.

Honors
U.S. Public Health Service Career Development Award
U.S. Public Health Service Career Award
NIH Merit Scholar
Fellow, American Association for the Advancement of Science
President, American Society of Human Genetics
Honorary Fellow, American College of Medical Genetics
Member, National Academy of Sciences

References

1923 births
Living people
American molecular biologists
American geneticists
American people of Romanian descent
Members of the United States National Academy of Sciences
United States Army Air Forces personnel of World War II
United States Army Air Forces soldiers
Scientists from Los Angeles